The Neepawa Titans are a Canadian Junior "A" ice hockey team from Neepawa, Manitoba.  They are members of the Manitoba Junior Hockey League (MJHL), a part of the Canadian Junior Hockey League, and play home games at the Yellowhead Centre.

History

Neepawa Natives (1989–2021)

 Neepawa's MJHL team was founded in 1989 as the Neepawa Natives.  The creation of the original team name was rooted in the early 1960s, with the then-named Neepawa Intermediates hockey team. In 1963, Ron Guinn and Cecil Pittman suggested the Neepawa Intermediates should create an actual team name for the Neepawa-based hockey club. A name that would connect to Neepawa (a Cree name meaning abundance or plenty) was explored. The name 'Natives' was selected because Neepawa and Natives both start with the letter 'N', and were seven letters long, which led Pittman and Guinn to believe it was a good fit for the team. They were also influenced by the many sports teams, throughout all of North America, that already had logos and team names that were Native American-themed. For example, the Cleveland Indians took their name in 1915. Scores of North American high schools and colleges also adopted Native American-themed team names and logos in the 1920s and 1930s.

The name would go on to be used by the intermediate team, who would play in the Inter Ridge Hockey League, the Central Plains Hockey League and the South West Hockey League in the 1960s and 1970s. In 1989, Neepawa was accepted into the MJHL and was in need of creating its own team name and identity. Wanting to respect the hockey history created by that Neepawa Intermediates team, it was decided to use the Natives name for the community's new Junior 'A' Hockey club.  The Natives name was gradually adopted by Neepawa Minor Hockey for its youth teams.

The Neepawa Natives had many successful seasons reaching the MJHL Finals in 1996 and the meeting in the division finals seven times.

Hazing incident
In October 2011, a 15-year-old player came forward with allegations of sexual-based rookie hazing within the team's locker room.  The victim's mother said her son was forced to walk around the team locker room with a set of water bottles tied to his scrotum and that assistant coach Brad Biggers was allegedly present in the dressing room at the time.  As a result, the Royal Canadian Mounted Police opened an investigation of the incident and the MJHL hired an independent investigator to look into the incident. 

Following its investigation, the MJHL levied a record $5000 fine against the team and a total of 18 suspensions to team players and personnel, as well an indefinite suspension to Biggers, preventing him from coaching for any team affiliated with Hockey Canada. Head coach and general manager Bryant Perrier, who initially reported the incident to the league, left his post shortly thereafter and also received an indefinite ban from the MJHL (which has since been rescinded).  The team later issued an apology to the hazing victims, its staff, sponsors, fans, and local community.  No criminal charges were laid by the RCMP.

Neepawa Titans (2021–present)
In July 2020, the team announced the intention to change its name and logo in response to growing pressure for sports teams to remove names and logos considered offensive to Indigenous peoples. The team's new name (Neepawa Titans) and logo, inspired by the Vegas Golden Knights theme, were unveiled in June 2021.  Among the other nicknames considered were the Bulls, Thunder, Salt Dogs and Generals.

Season-by-season record
Note: GP = games played, W = wins, L = losses, T = ties, OTL = overtime losses, GF = goals for, GA = goals against, DNQ = did not qualify

Playoffs
1990 DNQ
1991 Lost Quarter-final
Winnipeg South Blues defeated Neepawa Natives 4-games-to-none
1992 Lost Quarter-final
St. James Canadians defeated Neepawa Natives 4-games-to-1
1993 Lost Quarter-final
Portage Terriers defeated Neepawa Natives 4-games-to-none
1994 Lost Quarter-final
Dauphin Kings defeated Neepawa Natives 4-games-to-2
1995 Lost Semi-final
Neepawa Natives defeated Portage Terriers 4-games-to-none
Winkler Flyers defeated Neepawa Natives 4-games-to-3
1996 Lost Final
Neepawa Natives defeated Portage Terriers 4-games-to-3
Neepawa Natives defeated Dauphin Kings 4-games-to-2
St. James Canadians defeated Neepawa Natives 4-games-to-3
1997 Lost Quarter-final
Winkler Flyers defeated Neepawa Natives 4-games-to-3
1998 Lost Quarter-final
Winkler Flyers defeated Neepawa Natives 4-games-to-1
1999 DNQ
2000 DNQ
2001 Lost Semi-final
Neepawa Natives defeated Portage Terriers 4-games-to-3
OCN Blizzard defeated Neepawa Natives 4-games-to-1
2002 Lost Quarter-final
Portage Terriers defeated Neepawa Natives 4-games-to-1
2003 DNQ
2004 Lost Quarter-final
Swan Valley Stampeders defeated Neepawa Natives 4-games-to-2
2005 Lost Semi-final
Neepawa Natives defeated Dauphin Kings 4-games-to-2
Portage Terriers defeated Neepawa Natives 4-games-to-1
2006 DNQ
2007 Lost Semi-final
Neepawa Natives defeated Portage Terriers 4-games-to-3
Dauphin Kings defeated Neepawa Natives 4-games-to-2
2008 DNQ
2009 Lost Quarter-final
Winnipeg Saints defeated Neepawa Natives 4-games-to-none
2010 Lost Quarter-final
Dauphin Kings defeated Neepawa Natives 4-games-to-none
2011 DNQ
2012 DNQ
2013 DNQ
2014 DNQ
2015 DNQ
2016 DNQ
2017 Lost Quarter-final
Steinbach Pistons defeated Neepawa Natives 4-games-to-2
2018 DNQ
2019 DNQ
2020 DNQ
2021 Playoffs cancelled
2022 DNQ

See also
List of ice hockey teams in Manitoba
Manitoba Junior Hockey League
Hockey Manitoba

References

External links
Official Website

Manitoba Junior Hockey League teams